Marco Risi (born 4 June 1951) is an Italian film director, screenwriter, film producer and cinematographer.

Born in Milan, he is son of director Dino Risi. After graduating from Liceo Scientifico, Risi joined the faculty of philosophy, but abandoned his studies after two years. He began his career as an assistant of his uncle, Nelo Risi, for A Season in Hell (1971) and thereafter for directors such as Duccio Tessari, Steno, Alberto Sordi. He also collaborated with some scripts for films directed by his father. He made his directorial debut in 1977, with the RAI television documentary Appunti su Hollywood. After three quite successful comedy films, since 1987 Risi's cinema focused into more complex social and political issues, such as the military service seen as a traumatic experience (Soldati - 365 all'alba), the juvenile delinquency in and out of prison (Mery per sempre ("Forever Mary") and Ragazzi fuori), the crash of Itavia Flight 870 (Il muro di Gomma), the gang rape phenomenon (Il branco) and the murder of journalist Giancarlo Siani (Fort Apache Napoli).

In 1989 Risi's Mery per sempre won the Special Grand Prize of the Jury at the Montréal World Film Festival. For his 1990 film Ragazzi fuori Risi won the David di Donatello Award for Best Director and a Silver Osella for Best Cinematography at the 47th Venice International Film Festival.

In 1991 Risi started, together with Maurizio Tedesco, a film production company, "Sorpasso Film". In 1998 he won the Nastro d'Argento for Best Producer for Ferzan Özpetek's Hamam.

Filmography 

 I'm Going to Live by Myself (1982)
 A Boy and a Girl (1984)
 Love at First Sight (1985)
 Soldati - 365 all'alba (1987)
  Forever Mary (1989)
 Boys on the Outside (1990)
 The Rubber Wall (1991)
 Nel continente nero (1993)
 Il branco (1994)
 Kaputt Mundi (1998)
 Tre mogli (2001)
 Maradona, the Hand of God (2007)
 Fort Apache Napoli (2009)
 Cha cha cha (2013)
 Three Touches (2014)

References

External links 
 
 

1951 births
Film people from Milan
Italian film directors
Italian screenwriters
Italian male screenwriters
Living people
Nastro d'Argento winners
David di Donatello winners
Ciak d'oro winners